Sopot is a municipality of the city of Belgrade. According to the 2011 census results, the town has a population of 4,548 inhabitants while the municipality has 20,367 inhabitants.

Location 

History 

The area has remains from Roman period. There is a masonry drinking fountain in Sopot, for which the Roman stones from some now disappeared structure were used.

The name of Sopot is derived from the old Slavic word for water spring.(cf. Sopotnica). The word itself is onomatopeic of the water sound flowing out of the spring. There are numerous springs and short creeks and streams in the area.

The village was mentioned in written records for the first time in 1818. In 1823, Serbian ruling prince Miloš Obrenović ordered for the meyhane to be built on the road which through Sopot was heading for Belgrade. The tavern was known as šindralija type, because it was roofed by šindra, or shingle. In 1830, huts for the travelers to Belgrade were built around it, expanding effectivelly the venue into the khan. It remains the oldest structure in the town and today hosts the Heritage Museum. There is a small park in front of it, through which flows one of many streams. In 1893, Sopot was declared a small town (varošica) by the royal decree.

In October 2019, the village of Ropočevo was officially abolished and its territory was annexed to the town of Sopot.

Characteristics 

Since 1972, an annual film festival "Sofest" has been held in Sopot. It is held in July, in the town's Culture Hall.

At the town's center are the Municipal Hall surrounded by the lush greenery, a fountain, and a monument to World War I combatant Đura Prokić. After the festival, there are several other monuments inspired by the motion pictures. Large number of weekend houses was built throughout the municipality since the 1970s, by the residents of Belgrade. The town is also a trade center, with well known farmers market, with local goods which includes peppers, tomatoes, cucumbers and other vegetables and fruits.

Hilly areas on Kosmaj are covered with forests of oak, beech and common hornbeam. Monasteries of Tresije, Pavlovac and Kasteljan (in ruins), are local tourist attractions. The stone church of Saint Peter and Paul is located in the village of Nemenikuće. In the churchyard there are six mulberry trees, estimated to originate from between 1600 and 1650. Being on the access road to Belgrade, Sopot had numerous restaurants and kafanas, and earned a moniker of a settlement with largest number of kafanas per capita.

Nowadays, the municipality has a large Primary and Economics high school. Sopot has a soccer club called the Wolves from Kosmaj and a basketball club bearing the same name.

Settlements
Aside from the town of Sopot, the following settlements comprise the municipality:

 Babe
 Guberevac
 Dučina
 Drlupa
 Đurinci
 Mala Ivanča
 Mali Požarevac
 Nemenikuće
 Parcani
 Popović
 Ralja
 Rogača
 Sibnica
 Slatina
 Stojnik

Demographics

According to the 2011 census results, the municipality of Sopot has a population of 20,367 inhabitants.

Ethnic groups
The ethnic composition of the municipality:

Economy
The following table gives a preview of total number of registered people employed in legal entities per their core activity (as of 2018):

There are two game hunting grounds in the municipality: Trešnja, which extends into the Voždovac municipality, and Kosmaj, on the mountain of the same name.

Gallery

See also
 Subdivisions of Belgrade
 List of Belgrade neighborhoods and suburbs

References

External links 

 

 
Municipalities of Belgrade
Suburbs of Belgrade
Šumadija